William Ray Howerton (December 12, 1921 – December 18, 2001) was an American professional baseball player. An outfielder, he appeared in Major League Baseball in 247 games played during all or part of four seasons (–), for the St. Louis Cardinals, Pittsburgh Pirates, and New York Giants.

Howerton grew up on a ranch in Santa Ynez, California. After graduation from Santa Ynez High School, he attended St. Mary's College of California. He signed with the Boston Red Sox in 1943 and played three seasons in their farm system before being acquired by the Cardinals' organization. In September 1949, after Howerton batted .329 with 111 runs batted in for the Triple-A Columbus Red Birds, he was recalled by the Cardinals for a late-season trial. In , he made the Redbird roster out of spring training and had his most successful MLB season, appearing in 110 games and collecting 88 hits (38 for extra bases) and 59 runs batted in. He was traded to the Pirates on June 15, 1951, in a deal that included fellow Redbirds Howie Pollet, Ted Wilks and Joe Garagiola, and played in 80 games for Pittsburgh, batting .274 in his last full MLB season.

After retiring, Howerton entered the trucking business in California. He died in Blakely, Pennsylvania, at age 80. His son, also named Bill, was the head baseball coach of the University of Scranton from 1987 to 2002.

References

External links

 Baseball Almanac

Major League Baseball outfielders
St. Louis Cardinals players
Pittsburgh Pirates players
New York Giants (NL) players
Scranton Red Sox players
Louisville Colonels (minor league) players
Saint Mary's Gaels baseball players
Landis Millers players
Richmond Colts players
Scranton Miners players
Columbus Red Birds players
Hopewell Blue Sox players
Minneapolis Millers (baseball) players
Oakland Oaks (baseball) players
Beaumont Exporters players
Baseball players from California
People from Lompoc, California
1921 births
2001 deaths